The Radior was a French automobile manufactured from 1920 until 1922.  A few 1592 cc Ballot-engined cars were assembled by one M. Chapolard, a Rochet-Schneider agent in Bourg-en-Bresse, and sold under this name.

References
David Burgess Wise, The New Illustrated Encyclopedia of Automobiles.

Defunct motor vehicle manufacturers of France